Magowah Creek is a stream in the U.S. state of Mississippi.

Magowah most likely is a corruption of the surname "McGower", after a local settler. Variant names are "McCowens Creek", "McCowers Creek", and "McGowers Creek".

References

Rivers of Mississippi
Rivers of Lowndes County, Mississippi